Assumption Cathedral may refer to any of a number of cathedrals consecrated to the Assumption of Mary in the Roman Catholic tradition.

Europe

Austria
 Assumption of Mary Cathedral, Sankt Pölten
 Cathedral of the Assumption of Mary and St. Rupert, Wiener Neustadt

Belarus
 Cathedral Basilica of the Assumption of the Blessed Virgin Mary, Pinsk
 Co-Cathedral of the Assumption of the Virgin and St. Stanislaus, Mogilev

Croatia
 Assumption Cathedral in Dubrovnik
 Assumption Cathedral (Krk)
 Cathedral of the Assumption of the Virgin Mary, Varaždin

Hungary
 Assumption Cathedral, Kalocsa
 Assumption Cathedral, Miskolc
 Assumption Cathedral, Vác
 Our Lady of the Assumption Cathedral, Kaposvár
 Cathedral Basilica of the Assumption of Our Lady, Győr
 Cathedral of the Assumption, Esztergom

Ireland
 Cathedral of the Assumption, Carlow
 Cathedral of Our Lady Assumed into Heaven and St Nicholas, Galway
 Cathedral of the Assumption, Thurles
 Cathedral of the Assumption of the Blessed Virgin Mary, Tuam

Italy
 Cathedral of the Assumption of Mary (Lecce)
 Cathedral of the Assumption of Mary (Naples)
 Cathedral of the Assumption of Mary (Padua)

Poland
 Cathedral Basilica of the Assumption of the Blessed Virgin Mary, Białystok
 Cathedral of the Assumption of the Blessed Virgin Mary, Gorzów
 Cathedral Basilica of the Assumption of the Blessed Virgin Mary, Kielce
 Co-Cathedral Basilica of the Assumption, Kołobrzeg
 Cathedral Basilica of the Assumption of the Blessed Virgin Mary, Łowicz
 Cathedral Basilica of the Assumption, Pelplin
 Cathedral Basilica of the Assumption of the Blessed Virgin Mary, Sosnowiec
 Cathedral Basilica of the Assumption of the Blessed Virgin Mary, Gdańsk

Portugal
 Cathedral of Our Lady of the Assumption, Funchal
 Our Lady of the Assumption Cathedral, Lamego

Romania
 Assumption of Mary Cathedral, Baia Mare

Russia
 Cathedral of the Assumption of the Blessed Virgin Mary (Saint Petersburg)

Ukraine
 Cathedral of the Assumption of the Blessed Virgin Mary, Kharkiv
 Cathedral Basilica of the Assumption, Lviv
 Assumption of the Blessed Virgin Mary Cathedral, Odessa

Other countries
 Cathedral of the Assumption of the Virgin, Tbilisi, Georgia
 Cathedral of the Assumption of Mary, Hildesheim, Germany
 Assumption Cathedral, Chania, Crete, Greece
 Cathedral of Assumption of Blessed Virgin Mary (Strumica), Macedonia
 Cathedral of the Assumption, Gozo, Malta
 Cathedral of the Assumption of the Blessed Virgin Mary (Rožňava), Slovakia
 Assumption Cathedral, Koper, Slovenia
 Cathedral of the Assumption of the Virgin, Tashkent, Uzbekistan

North America

Canada
 Assumption Cathedral, Trois-Rivières, Quebec
 Our Lady of Assumption Co-Cathedral, Gravelbourg, Saskatchewan
 Our Lady of the Assumption Cathedral, Moncton, New Brunswick

United States
 Cathedral of Saint Mary of the Assumption (San Francisco, California)
 Cathedral Basilica of the Assumption (Covington, Kentucky)
 Cathedral of the Assumption (Louisville, Kentucky)
 Cathedral of St. Mary of the Assumption (Fall River, Massachusetts)
 Cathedral of Mary of the Assumption (Saginaw, Michigan)
 Cathedral of St. Mary of the Assumption (Trenton, New Jersey)

Other places
 St. Mary of the Assumption Cathedral, Jakarta, Indonesia
 Assumption of Mary Cathedral, Hiroshima, Japan
 Cathedral of the Assumption, Majuro, Marshall Islands
 Assumption of the Blessed Virgin Mary Cathedral, Kathmandu, Nepal
 Assumption Cathedral, Bangkok, Thailand

See also
 Cathedral of the Dormition of the Theotokos (disambiguation)
 Basilica of the Assumption (disambiguation)
 Cathedral of Our Lady of the Assumption (disambiguation)
 Cathedral of Saint Mary of the Assumption (disambiguation)
 Cathedral of Santa Maria Assunta (disambiguation)
 Cathedral of the Assumption of the Blessed Virgin Mary (disambiguation)
 Cathedral of the Dormition (disambiguation)